Susen Tiedtke (born 23 January 1969 in East Berlin, East Germany) is a German former long jumper, who took part in two editions of the Summer Olympics and won a silver and a bronze medal at the IAAF World Indoor Championships in Athletics in 1993 and 1995 respectively.

Tiedtke represented Germany in the long jump at the 1992 Olympic Games, where she finished 8th, and the 2000 Olympic Games, where she finished 5th. At the 1992 games, Tiedtke had originally finished ninth, but was promoted to eighth after the drugs disqualification of Nijole Medvedeva. This would also happen in 2000 when she was promoted from sixth to fifth after the drugs disqualification of Marion Jones.

Doping
Following her bronze medal win at the 1995 IAAF World Indoor Championships, Tiedtke tested positive for Oral-Turinabol, and was banned for two years.

Gymnastics
Tiedtke won the East German championship in balance beam in 1982.

Playboy
Tiedtke appeared in the September 2004 edition of Playboy entitled Women of the Olympics.

Private life
Tiedtke married Joe Greene, an American long jumper, in December 1993. They lived in Dublin, Ohio. She changed her name to Susen Tiedtke-Greene. They divorced in 1998, and she moved back to Germany and reverted to her original name. She has been married to former tennis professional Hendrik Dreekmann since 28 January 2005.

Achievements
All results regarding Long Jump

w = wind-assisted

See also
List of doping cases in athletics

References

External links
 

1969 births
Living people
German female long jumpers
Athletes (track and field) at the 1992 Summer Olympics
Athletes (track and field) at the 2000 Summer Olympics
Olympic athletes of Germany
Athletes from Berlin
People from East Berlin
Doping cases in athletics
German sportspeople in doping cases
20th-century German women